Harold Norman Holgate AO (5 December 1933 – 16 March 1997) was a Labor Party politician and Premier of Tasmania from 11 November 1981 to 26 May 1982.

Born in Maitland, New South Wales in 1933, Holgate was a television producer and journalist prior to entering politics, arriving in Tasmania to work for The Examiner newspaper in 1963. He first stood for election in 1972 but was unable to meet the required quota of 4,707 votes. From 1973 to 1974, he worked as a press secretary for Deputy Prime Minister Lance Barnard.

In 1974, he was elected on a recount after the resignation of Allan Foster. He held his seat from 26 July 1974 until 1992, and was Speaker of the Tasmanian House of Assembly from May 1975 to December 1976. Holgate became Premier in 1981 after a motion of no confidence was raised against Doug Lowe, who subsequently resigned from the party. Holgate only stayed in office for seven months, before being defeated by Robin Gray's Liberals at the 1982 election—only the second time in 48 years that Labor had been consigned to opposition in Tasmania.

Until Lara Giddings in 2014, Holgate was the last defeated Premier who did not then serve as Leader of the Opposition. When the ALP next achieved government in 1989, under Michael Field, Holgate was not included in the cabinet. Nevertheless, he remained a member of parliament until he retired at the 1992 election. He died of cancer in Launceston on 16 March 1997.

References

External links
 

|-

|-

1933 births
1997 deaths
Premiers of Tasmania
Officers of the Order of Australia
Speakers of the Tasmanian House of Assembly
Members of the Tasmanian House of Assembly
People from Maitland, New South Wales
Deaths from cancer in Tasmania
Australian television producers
Treasurers of Tasmania
Australian Labor Party members of the Parliament of Tasmania
20th-century Australian politicians
20th-century Australian journalists